Rollinia ferruginea is a species of plant in the Annonaceae family.

Description
The plant is endemic to the Atlantic Forest ecoregion of Brazil. It is restricted to forests around the city of Rio de Janeiro.

It grows to a maximum of 2 m (6 ft) in height.

Rollinia ferruginea has been assessed by the IUCN as being an endangered species since 1998.

References

ferruginea
Endemic flora of Brazil
Flora of Rio de Janeiro (state)
Flora of the Atlantic Forest
Endangered plants
Taxonomy articles created by Polbot